Andrei Vladimirovich Langovich (born 28 May 2003) is a Russian football player. He plays as a right-back for FC Rostov.

Club career
He was raised in the FC Rostov academy and was first called up to the senior squad in November 2020.

He made his debut in the Russian Premier League for FC Rostov on 23 July 2021 in a game against FC Dynamo Moscow, he substituted Denis Terentyev in the 80th minute.

On 19 April 2022, Langovich signed a new five-year contract with Rostov.

Career statistics

References

External links
 
 
 

2003 births
Living people
Russian footballers
Russia youth international footballers
Russia under-21 international footballers
Association football defenders
FC Rostov players
Russian Premier League players